Fata Morgana Land was a phantom island in the Arctic. It supposedly lay between north-east Greenland and Svalbard, at the northern end of the Greenland Sea.

History
This sighting occurred in 1907, during the 1906–08 Danmark Expedition led by Ludvig Mylius-Erichsen. Land was also allegedly sighted near this location by Lauge Koch in 1933, from the air, as well as by Peter Freuchen in 1935 and by Ivan Papanin in 1937. Following Papanin's sighting, Koch undertook a seaplane expedition from Svalbard in 1938 to search for the supposed island. He used a Dornier Wal, 297 'Samum', purchased by the Danish government from Germany. With Flight Captain Rudolf Mayer and wireless operator Franz Preuschoff (lent from Deutsche Luft Hansa) and a Danish naval officer, Koch flew from Copenhagen to Kings Bay in Spitsbergen. They approached Greenland from different directions but were unable to find any trace of land.

The non-existent island was named Fata Morgana Land after a type of mirage common in polar regions, Fata Morgana (mirage). The assumption is, the mirage sighted at its location was actually Fata Morganas of Tobias Island, a barren, rocky island to the south.

See also
Cartographic expeditions to Greenland
Fata Morgana (mirage)
List of islands of Greenland

References

Phantom Arctic islands
History of Greenland